Civil service reform refers to movements for the improvement of the civil service in methods of appointment, rules of conduct, etc.  Relevant articles are:

 On historical movements: spoils system and merit system
 Civil Service Reform Act of 1978
 Civil service reform in developing countries
 Hatch Act of 1939
 National Civil Service Reform League
 Pendleton Civil Service Reform Act
 U.S. Civil Service Reform